are a group mountains on the western coast of Hokkaidō. The mountain range is divided into two regions by the Hamamasu River. The northern region is a group of volcanic mountains called Shokanbetsudake Mountains. The southern region is known as the Kabato Mountains.  The Mashike mountains lie between the Teshio Mountains to the north and the Ishikari Plain to the south. Mashikie mountains includes part of Shokanbetsu-Teuri-Yagishiri Quasi-National Park.

The highest peak of the Mashike mountains is Mount Shokanbetsu (1492m).

Flora and fauna
Unlike on Honshū, you can see alpine plants at altitudes as low as 1000 meters in the Mashike mountains.

References

Mountain ranges of Hokkaido